Francis or Frank Duffy may refer to:

 Francis Duffy (bishop) (born 1958), Roman Catholic Bishop of Ardagh and Clonmacnoise
 Francis Clyde Duffy (1890–1977), Lieutenant Governor of North Dakota
 Francis Noel Duffy, Irish Green Party politician for Dublin South-West
 Francis P. Duffy (1871–1932), Roman Catholic priest in the U.S.
 Frank Duffy (architect) (born 1940), British architect
 Frank Duffy (baseball) (born 1946), Major League Baseball player
 Frank Duffy (curler) (1959–2010), Scottish wheelchair curler
 Frank Duffy (equestrian) (born 1937), American equestrian
 Frank Duffy (labor leader) (1861–1955), American labor leader and secretary-general
 Sir Frank Gavan Duffy (1852–1936), Australian judge

See also
 F. Ryan Duffy (1888–1979), U.S. Senator from Wisconsin